Mengler Hill (formerly Mengler's Hill) is a hill and popular lookout in the Barossa Range, South Australia. The hill was named after an early wine grower in the area. The Barossa Sculpture Park is sited at the base of the lookout area. The road route from Tanunda to Angaston crosses Mengler Hill.

See also
Barossa Valley

References

External links
 Barossa Sculpture Park

Barossa Valley
Mountains of South Australia
Hills of Australia